2009 census may refer to:

Belarus Census (2009)
2009 Vanuatu Census